The Battle of Sittimungulum (variant spellings include Sattiamungulum, Sathinungulum, Satyamanagalam) was a series of battles and skirmishes fought between 13 and 15 September 1790, during the Third Anglo-Mysore War, in and near the town now known as Sathyamangalam in the southern part of the Sultanate of Mysore.  Forces of Mysore's ruler Tipu Sultan very nearly overwhelmed a British East India Company force under the command of Captain John Floyd.

Tipu "descended the Gajalhatti Pass on 9th September", attacked Floyd and forcing Floyd to retreat to Coimbatore after suffering 500 casualties.  However, Tipu lost Burhar-ud-din, "one of his able commanders."  Tipu left this front under the command of Kamar-ud Khan, while he dealt with British attacks elsewhere.

References

Marshman, John Clark (1863). The history of India

Sittimungulum
Sittimungulum
Sittimungulum
Sittimungulum
Sittimungulum
1790 in India
History of Coimbatore